Hrvoje Milić (born 10 May 1989) is a Croatian professional footballer who recently played as a full back for Zrinski Jurjevac.

He has played for Fiorentina in Italy, Osijek, Hajduk Split and Istra 1961 in Croatia, Djurgården in Sweden, Rostov in Russia and Esteghlal in Iran.

Club career
Born in Osijek, Milić started his career at the youth sides of NK Osijek before moving to HNK Hajduk Split where he first started in their under-19 side. He made his professional debut in the Croatian Derby against GNK Dinamo Zagreb on 8 March 2008. He made one further appearance that season.

Milić moved to Djurgårdens IF in March 2009 after failing to crack the first team at Hajduk. At Djurgården, he immediately became a prominent first team member, making 30 appearances in his first season with the club. He also managed four goals and four assists that same season.

He moved back to Croatia in July 2011, joining NK Istra 1961 on a free transfer. He was a starter throughout the 11–12 season, making 26 appearances and scoring one goal. His next season was even more successful, making 31 appearances, scoring four goals and making three assists.

In July 2013, he moved to FC Rostov in a deal worth around €350k. In Milić's first season at Rostov, he made 29 appearances, scoring one goal and managing four assists mostly from a left back position.

Return to Hajduk
In August 2015 he signed a three-year contract with Hajduk Split. Milić made his Hajduk debut in a Europa League qualifier against Slovan Liberec on the 20th of that same month. His first season at Hajduk was below average and most people considered that he didn't justify the expectations of the club and fans. Milić made 42 appearances in his return season, scoring one goal and making seven assists.

Fiorentina
On 16 August 2016, Milić joined Serie A side ACF Fiorentina in a deal which saw a reported €700.000 transfer fee go to Hajduk.

Olympiakos
On 22 July 2017, only after a season in Serie A (that has been disappointing), Milić has been sold to reigning Greek champions Olympiacos for €1.5 million. Having fallen surplus to requirements by his then club managers Besnik Hasi and Takis Lemonis, his contract was officially terminated by the Reds on 31 January 2018, playing only four games with the club in all competitions.

Napoli
On 23 February 2018, he returned to the Italian Serie A after being signed by S.S.C. Napoli who signed him to replace the injured Faouzi Ghoulam.

Crotone
On 31 January 2019, he signed with the Italian Serie B club Crotone.

Esteghlal
On 19 August 2019, Milić moved to Iranian club Esteghlal on a two-year contract.

Career statistics

Club

1 Includes UEFA Europa League and AFC Champions League matches.

Honours
Esteghlal
Hazfi Cup: Runners-up (2):2019–20,  2020–21

References

External links
 

1989 births
Living people
Sportspeople from Osijek
Association football wingers
Association football fullbacks
Croatian footballers
Croatia international footballers
HNK Hajduk Split players
Djurgårdens IF Fotboll players
NK Istra 1961 players
FC Rostov players
ACF Fiorentina players
Olympiacos F.C. players
S.S.C. Napoli players
F.C. Crotone players
Esteghlal F.C. players
Croatian Football League players
Allsvenskan players
Russian Premier League players
Serie A players
Super League Greece players
Serie B players
Persian Gulf Pro League players
Second Football League (Croatia) players
Croatian expatriate footballers
Expatriate footballers in Sweden
Croatian expatriate sportspeople in Sweden
Expatriate footballers in Russia
Croatian expatriate sportspeople in Russia
Expatriate footballers in Italy
Croatian expatriate sportspeople in Italy
Expatriate footballers in Greece
Croatian expatriate sportspeople in Greece
Expatriate footballers in Iran
Croatian expatriate sportspeople in Iran